Mohammed II may refer to:
Muhammad II of Córdoba (fl. 852–866), fourth Caliph of Cordoba, of the Umayyad dynasty in the Al-Andalus (Moorish Iberia)
Muhammad II of Ifriqiya (d. 875), eighth Emir of Ifriqiya from Aghlabid house (864–875)
Mehmed II of Kerman, see List of Seljuk rulers of Kerman (1041–1187)
Mahmud II of Great Seljuk (died 1131), proclaimed himself the Seljuk sultan of Baghdad
Muhammad II of Great Seljuq (died 1159)
Muhammad II of Khwarezm, ruler of the Khwarezmid Empire from 1200 to 1220
Muhammad II of Granada, second Nasrid ruler of the Emirate of Granada in Al-Andalus on the Iberian Peninsula (r. 22 January 1273 – 8 April 1302)
Mehmed II  "the Conqueror" (1432–1481), Sultan of the Ottoman Empire
Mohamed II of the Maldives, Sultan of Maldives from 1467 to 1481
Muhammad II ibn al-Husayn (1811–1859), eleventh leader of the Husainid Dynasty and ruler of Tunisia